Orophea yunnanensis is a species of plant in the Annonaceae family. It is endemic to China.

References

yunnanensis
Endemic flora of China
Critically endangered plants
Taxonomy articles created by Polbot
Plants described in 1976